Millennium Hilton Seoul is a luxury hotel in Seoul, part of Hilton Hotels & Resorts. The hotel opened in 1983 as the Seoul Hilton and is located at 50 Sowol-ro, Jung-gu, in the central business and shopping district in downtown Seoul. 

The hotel was originally owned by Daewoo Group, which sold it to City Developments Limited in 1999. In December 2021, City Developments announced plans to sell the hotel and adjacent land to IGIS Asset Management, a Korean real estate firm, for 1.1 trillion won ($934 million).

Millennium Seoul Hilton is listed in the Forbes Travel Guide.

On December 31, 2022 the hotel announced that its final day of operation would be on the following Saturday and that it would no longer be affiliated with the Hilton brand from January 1, 2023.

References

Hotels in Seoul
Hotels established in 1983
Hotel buildings completed in 1983
Hilton Hotels & Resorts hotels